Aziza is a studio album by English jazz bassist Dave Holland with saxophonist Chris Potter, guitarist Lionel Loueke and drummer Eric Harland. The album was released on October 14, 2016 via  Holland's own Dare2 Records label.

Background
Dave Holland explained that the name Aziza has come from one of their songs, “Aziza Dance,” written by Lionel Loueke. In Loueke's birthplace of Benin, Aziza means a supernatural race of forest dwellers giving practical and spiritual advice. The album features eight original compositions—two from each band member.

Reception
Cormak Larkin of The Irish Times noted, "...there’s no doubting who is the elder statesman here, nor whose spirit is guiding proceedings. Dave Holland has been taking music in new and interesting directions since the late 1960s. And though each member of Aziza contributes a couple of tunes and brings their own unique character to the mix, most audible in this new group’s taut, funky, expansive sound are echoes of former Holland projects such as his Extensions quartet, and even the distant rumble of the great Gateway Trio". Peter Hum writing for Ottawa Citizen commented, "As much as I’ve liked the previous Holland-centred supergroups, the Aziza project stands out, thanks to Loueke’s special creativity, sonic breadth and his keenness to engage with everyone else in the band. Let’s hope this album isn’t simply a one-off." Will Layman of PopMatters stated, "In the balance between cliche and astonishment, Aziza overwhelmingly stays on the correct side of the law. Supergroup pitfalls are avoided, mostly, but fun is definitely had. You can imagine the band smiling as they left the studio. Indeed, these guys like playing together."

John McBeath of The Australian wrote, "This quartet is  four stellar US musicians, all bandleaders, and each at the very top of their abilities, working beautifully together....These four names will probably be sufficient to invite a listening for jazz fans where the spectrum of emotion and diversity of approach is bound to secure interest." Ron Netsky in his review for City Newspaper wrote, "Aziza" is a world of discovery from start to finish." Jeff Simon of The Buffalo News wrote, "Here's a jazz all-star band to get almost anyone's attention -- and keep it for long periods too. Unfortunately, what that doesn't mean is that every selection on the record is worthy of the spectacular talent that went into it."

Track listing

Personnel
Band
Chris Potter – tenor & soprano saxophone
Lionel Loueke – guitar & vocals
Dave Holland – bass, producer 
Eric Harland – drums

Production
Louise Holland – executive producer
James Farber – engineer 
Owen Mulholland – engineer 
Greg Calbi – mastering
Scott Fallone – mastering 
Govert Driessen – photography 
Ulli Gruber – photography 
Susan Archie – art direction, design
Rafael Gonzalez – artwork

Charts

References

External links

Dave Holland albums
2016 albums